Young blood transfusion refers to transfusing blood specifically from a young person into an older one with the intention of creating a health benefit. The scientific community currently views the practice as essentially pseudoscientific, with comparisons to snake oil. There are also concerns of harm. The U.S. Food and Drug Administration, in 2019, cautioned "consumers against receiving young donor plasma infusions" stating that they are an "unproven treatment".

Research 
Experiments beginning in the 1950s in the Cornell University lab of Clive McCay on pairs of old and young rodents placed into parabiosis provided some evidence, albeit limited and "largely anecdotal", that the circulation of blood from young mice increased both the longevity and the tissue function of old mice. After decades in which relatively little work on parabiosis in aging was done, the work was revived by researchers at Stanford University and the University of California at Berkeley. Parabiosis experiments are difficult to generalize, as the circulatory systems of the mice are fully joined and it is unclear whether the benefits come from the sharing of blood or the older mouse's access to the younger mouse's organs. A study conducted at UC Berkeley found that when delivered alone, blood from older mice was more inhibitory to the regenerative capacities of younger mice than blood from younger mice was beneficial to older ones, and that the benefit of young blood in older mice was less than had been observed when older mice were subjected to parabiosis.

In experiments like this, researchers found that some of the parabiosed died quickly (11 out of 69 in one experiment) for reasons the scientists could not explain, but described as possibly some form of immune rejection; most such cases were the young parabiont. Amy Wagers, a researcher who coauthored several mouse studies on young blood transfusion, has said that her papers do not provide a scientific basis for some of the existing human trials.

A review of studies on donor age for whole blood transfusions reported that blood from donors under the age of 20 years, when compared to donors aged 20–60 years, resulted in a modestly higher risk of death in the recipients. However, other studies have found no effect of age. Research on blood transfusion outcomes has been complicated by the lack of careful characterization of the transfusion products that have been used in clinical trials; studies had focused on how storage methods and duration might affect blood, but not on the differences among lots of blood themselves.

Another approach to achieving "younger" blood is to rejuvenate blood-producing stem cells in the bone marrow. A 2023 study reported that the existing arthritis drug anakinra blocked IL-1B in elderly mice and returned those cells to a more youthful state.

Commercial development
In February 2019 the FDA warned about companies offering young blood transfusions stating:

Ambrosia 
A startup company, Ambrosia, has been selling "young blood transfusions" for $8,000 since 2016 under the guise of running a clinical trial, to see if such transfusions lead to changes in the blood of recipients. As of August 2017, they had 600 people join. The clinical trial has no control arm and so is neither randomized nor blind. As described, whole blood collected by blood banks that had passed its 42-day storage limit was centrifuged to remove cells, the resulting cell-free plasma pooled from several donations and intravenously transfused into recipients. The company was started by Jesse Karmazin, a medical school graduate without a license to practice medicine. David Wright is the licensed doctor overseeing the clinical trial; in his practice he administers intravenous treatments of vitamins and antibiotics for nontraditional purposes and was disciplined by the California Medical Board for the latter in 2015. Jonathan Kimmelman, a bioethicist from McGill University, suggests that Ambrosia is running this as a trial as they would be unable to get FDA approval to sell this treatment otherwise.

On February 19, 2019, Ambrosia announced it stopped testing the treatment, responding to concerns from the FDA.

Alkahest 
Another company, Alkahest, was founded based on the Stanford rodent studies. As of 2017 it is collaborating with European pharmaceutical company Grifols to create a blood plasma-based experimental biologic drug which they propose to test on people with Alzheimer's.

Maharaj/Faloon trial 
Scientific American reported in 2018 that young blood transfusion was being offered as a paid "trial", which, like Ambrosia's trial, had no distinct control group from the treatment; it also charged participants $285,000 per person. Dipnarine Maharaj, a Florida physician running the trial, has previously offered both traditional and nontraditional anti-aging treatments such as stem cell banking. He also has ties to the Hippocrates Health Institute, an organization promoting unproven alternative medicine. This trial was promoted by Bill Faloon, who founded the Life Extension Foundation, which was raided by the FDA In 1987 for illegally importing medicine, though the case was dropped in 1996.

Young Blood Institute 
An organization called the Young Blood Institute has also run trials; these, however, involved exchange only of blood plasma.

References

Further reading
 

Alternative medicine
Transfusion medicine
Pseudoscience